The men's competition in the bantamweight (– 56 kg) division was staged on November 20, 2009.

Schedule

Medalists

Records

Results

References
Results 

- Mens 56 kg, 2009 World Weightlifting Championships